Venice is a 2014 Cuban drama film directed by Kiki Álvarez. It was screened in the Contemporary World Cinema section at the 2014 Toronto International Film Festival.

Cast
 Claudia Muñiz as Violeta
 Jazz Vilá as Ada-Adalberto
 Maribel Garcia Garzón as Mónica
 Marianela Pupo as Mayelín

References

External links
 

2014 films
2014 drama films
Cuban drama films
2010s Spanish-language films